Alucheh-ye Sabalan (also Romanized as Ālūcheh-ye Sabalān) is a village in the Sabalan District of Sareyn County, Ardabil Province, Iran. At the 2006 census, its population was 121 in 26 families.

References 

Towns and villages in Sareyn County